LLGC may refer to:
 London Lesbian and Gay Centre
 Llyfrgell Genedlaethol Cymru – The National Library of Wales
 LLG Cultural Development Centre
 Lim Lian Giok